The 2019–20 Iowa Hawkeyes men's basketball team represented the University of Iowa during the 2019–20 NCAA Division I men's basketball season. The team was led by 10th-year head coach Fran McCaffery and played their home games at Carver–Hawkeye Arena as members of the Big Ten Conference. They finished the season 20–11, 11–9 in Big Ten play to finish in four-way tie for fifth place. Their season ended when postseason tournaments including the Big Ten tournament and the NCAA tournament were canceled due to the coronavirus pandemic.

Forward Luka Garza was named Big Ten Player of the Year and was a consensus All-American.

Previous season
The Hawkeyes finished the 2018–19 season 23–12, 10–10 in Big Ten play to finish in sixth place. They defeated Illinois in the second round of the Big Ten tournament before losing to Michigan in the quarterfinals. They received an at-large bid to the NCAA tournament as the No. 10 seed in the South region. There they defeated No. 7-seeded Cincinnati in the First Round before losing to No. 2-seeded Tennessee in the Second Round.

Offseason

Departures

Incoming transfers

2019 recruiting class

2020 recruiting class

Roster

Schedule and results

|-
!colspan=9 style=| Exhibition

|-
!colspan=9 style=| Regular season

|-
!colspan=9 style=|Big Ten tournament
|-
!colspan=9 style=|Canceled
|-
!colspan=9 style=|NCAA tournament
|-
!colspan=9 style=|Canceled
|-

Source: Schedule

Rankings

*Coaches did not release a Week 1 poll.

References

Iowa
Iowa Hawkeyes men's basketball seasons
Hawk
Hawk